Typhonia is a genus of moths of the Psychidae family.

Selected species
Some species of this genus are:

Typhonia abacodes 	(Meyrick, 1908)
Typhonia alluaudiella (Viette, 1954)
Typhonia amica 	(Meyrick, 1908)
Typhonia anasactis  (Meyrick, 1907) (from Sri Lanka)
Typhonia animosa 	(Meyrick, 1913)
Typhonia autopetra  (Meyrick, 1907) (from Sri Lanka)
Typhonia autochthonia  (Meyrick, 1931) (from India)
Typhonia bettoni 	(Butler, 1898)
Typhonia bimaculata Sobczyk & Schütte, 2010
Typhonia brachiata  (Meyrick, 1919) (from India)
Typhonia campestris  (Meyrick, 1916) (from India)
Typhonia certatrix  (Meyrick, 1916) (from India)
Typhonia circophora 	(Meyrick, 1909)
Typhonia cnaphalodes 	(Meyrick, 1917
Typhonia coagulata  (Meyrick, 1919) (from India)
Typhonia colonica  (Meyrick, 1916) (from India)
Typhonia craterodes 	(Meyrick, 1917)
Typhonia cremata  (Meyrick, 1916) (from India)
Typhonia cylindraula 	(Meyrick, 1920)
Typhonia decaryella (Viette, 1955) (from Madagascar)
Typhonia deposita  (Meyrick, 1919) (from India)
Typhonia dissoluta 	(Meyrick, 1908)
Typhonia energa  (Meyrick, 1905) (from Sri Lanka)
Typhonia effervescens (Meyrick, 1911)
Typhonia expressa  (Meyrick, 1916) (from Sri Lanka)
Typhonia exsecrata  (Meyrick, 1937) (from India)
Typhonia fibriculatella (Viette, 1956)
Typhonia frenigera  (Meyrick, 1911) (from Sri Lanka)
Typhonia granularis  (Meyrick, 1916) (from Sri Lanka)
Typhonia gregaria  (Meyrick, 1916) (from India)
Typhonia gypsopetra 	(Meyrick, 1937)
Typhonia halieutis 	(Meyrick, 1908)
Typhonia homopercna 	(Meyrick, 1920)
Typhonia isopeda  (Meyrick, 1907) (from India)
Typhonia jactata  (Meyrick, 1937) (from India)
Typhonia imparata  (Meyrick, 1928) (from India)
Typhonia indigena 	(Meyrick, 1917)
Typhonia infensa  (Meyrick, 1916) (from India)
Typhonia interscissa 	(Meyrick, 1924)
Typhonia inveterata 	(Meyrick, 1915)
Typhonia leucosceptra  (Meyrick, 1907) (from Sri Lanka)
Typhonia lignosa  (Meyrick, 1917) (from India)
Typhonia nota  (Meyrick, 1919) (from India)
Typhonia linodyta 	(Meyrick, 1921)
Typhonia liochra 	(Meyrick, 1908)
Typhonia marmarodes 	(Meyrick, 1920)
Typhonia meliphaea  (Meyrick, 1916) (from India)
Typhonia metherca  (Meyrick, 1916) (from Sri Lanka)
Typhonia multiplex  (Meyrick, 1917) (from India)
Typhonia mylica 	(Meyrick, 1908)
Typhonia nectaritis 	(Meyrick, 1915)
Typhonia nigrescens 	(Meyrick, 1920)
Typhonia obtrectans  (Meyrick, 1930) (from India)
Typhonia onthostola  (Meyrick, 1937)( (from India)
Typhonia paraphrictis (Meyrick, 1908)
Typhonia paraclasta  (Meyrick, 1922) (from India)
Typhonia paricropa  (Meyrick, 1907) (from India)
Typhonia pelostrota 	(Meyrick, 1927)
Typhonia pericrossa  (Meyrick, 1907) (from India)
Typhonia petrodes 	(Meyrick, 1914)
Typhonia phaeogenes  (Meyrick, 1919) (from India)
Typhonia picea 	(Meyrick, 1917)
Typhonia praecepta  (Meyrick, 1916) (from India)
Typhonia ptyalistis  (Meyrick, 1937) (from India)
Typhonia ramifera  (Meyrick, 1916) (from India)
Typhonia rhythmopis  (Meyrick, 1928) (Andamans)
Typhonia salicoma 	(Meyrick, 1918)
Typhonia semota  (Meyrick, 1937) (from India)
Typhonia seyrigiella (Viette, 1954) (from Madagascar)
Typhonia stelitis 	(Meyrick, 1908)
Typhonia stratifica  (Meyrick, 1907) (from Sri Lanka)
Typhonia stupea 	(Wallengren, 1875)
Typhonia subacta  (Meyrick, 1919) (from India)
Typhonia susurrans 	(Meyrick, 1911)
Typhonia systolaea 	(Meyrick, 1908)
Typhonia talaria 	(Meyrick, 1924)
Typhonia tanyphaea 	(Meyrick, 1924)
Typhonia tetraspila  (Meyrick, 1905) (from Sri Lanka)
Typhonia tylota  (Meyrick, 1916) (from India)
Typhonia tyrophanes 	(Meyrick, 1917)
Typhonia vadonella (Viette, 1955) (from Madagascar)
Typhonia vorticosa  (Meyrick, 1930) (from India)

References

Markku Savela's ftp.funet.fi

 , 2000: Typhonia beatricis sp. n., eine möglicherweise aus dem östlichen Mittelmeerraum eingeschleppte Psychide (Lepidoptera, Psychidae). Mitteilungen der Entomologischen Gesellschaft Basel 50 (1): 2–17.
 , 2011: World Catalogue of Insects Volume 10 Psychidae (Lepidoptera): 1-467.
 , 2012: Beiträge zur kenntnis der orientalischen Psychidae IV.Die arten von Typhonia Boisduval, 1834 in Südostasien (Lepidoptera). Entomologische Zeitschrift EZ1: 13-19.
  2010: Two new species, taxonomic notes and a checklist of bagworm moths from Madagascar (Lepidoptera, Psychidae). Deutsche Entomologische Zeitschrift 57 (1): 59-68. Abstract: . Full article: .

 
Psychidae
Psychidae genera